The 1869 Bradford by-election was fought on 12 March 1869.  The by-election was held due to the previously voided election of the incumbent Liberal MP, Henry William Ripley.  In an all Liberal contest, it was won by the Liberal candidate Edward Miall.

References

By-elections to the Parliament of the United Kingdom in Bradford constituencies
1869 elections in the United Kingdom
1869 in England
19th century in Yorkshire
March 1869 events